The Bradford Bees were a minor league baseball team based in Bradford, Pennsylvania. The team was a charter member of the Pennsylvania-Ontario-New York (PONY) League and played 18 seasons from 1939 to 1957 (the team sat out the 1943 season due to World War II). Over the course of the team's history, the team also played under the names Bradford Beagles, Bradford Blue Wings, Bradford Phillies and Bradford Yankees. In its last season, the Beagles split their schedule between Bradford and Hornell after the Hornell Dodgers had ceased operations; in Hornell, the team was known as the Hornell Redlegs.

As the Bees, the team won the league title in 1941. The Blue Wings also won a league title in 1949.

Bradford no longer hosts baseball at the professional level, nor does it host summer baseball as a few other former PONY League markets that have shrunk to the point where they can no longer support the professional game have done.

Notable alumni

Hall of Fame alumni
 Warren Spahn (1940) Inducted, 1973

Other notable alumni
 Roy Face (1949-1950) 6 x MLB All-Star
 Frank McCormick (1951) 9 x MLB All-Star; 1940 NL Most Valuable Player
 Jim Owens (1951)
 Jack Sanford (1948) MLB All-Star; 1957 NL Rookie of the Year
 Carl Sawatski (1945)

McKean County, Pennsylvania
Defunct baseball teams in Pennsylvania
Defunct New York–Penn League teams
Baseball teams established in 1939
Baseball teams disestablished in 1957
Boston Bees minor league affiliates
Boston Braves minor league affiliates
Cincinnati Reds minor league affiliates
New York Yankees minor league affiliates
Philadelphia Phillies minor league affiliates
1939 establishments in Pennsylvania
1957 disestablishments in Pennsylvania